Zoltán Bánföldi (born 27 July 1971) is a former Hungarian footballer.

He played for Békéscsabai Előre FC as a midfielder, and finished his career with Vác-Újbuda LTC.

References

1971 births
Living people
People from Vác
Hungarian footballers
Association football midfielders
Vác FC players
Tiszakécske FC footballers
Budapest Honvéd FC players
Békéscsaba 1912 Előre footballers
People from Veresegyház
Sportspeople from Pest County